Microcotyle guanabarensis a species of monogenean, parasitic on the gills of a marine fish. It belongs to the family Microcotylidae.

Systematics
Microcotyle guanabarensis was first described by Bravo-Hollis and Kohn in 1990 from the gills of Eucinostomus argenteus (Gerreidae) off Brasil.

Morphology
Microcotyle guanabarensis has the general morphology of all species of Microcotyle, with a symmetrical body, comprising an anterior part which contains most organs and a posterior part called the haptor. The haptor is symmetrical, and bears numerous clamps, arranged as two rows, one on each side. The clamps of the haptor attach the animal to the gill of the fish. There are also two buccal suckers at the anterior extremity. The digestive organs include an anterior, terminal mouth, a  pharynx, an oesophagus and a posterior intestine with two lateral branches provided with numerous secondary branches. Each adult contains male and female reproductive organs. The reproductive organs include an anterior  genital atrium, armed with numerous very spines, a medio-dorsal vagina , a single ovary and a number of testes which are posterior to the ovary.

Etymology
The specific name guanabarensis is derived from the type locality, Guanabara Bay.

Hosts and localities
The type-host of Microcotyle guanabarensis is  Eucinostomus argenteus (Gerreidae). The type-locality is off Rio de Janeiro (Brazil). Microcotyle guanabarensis was reported again from the type-host and locality.

References 

Microcotylidae
Animals described in 1990
Parasites of fish
Fauna of Brazil